Johann Heinrich Walch (1776–1855), was a German conductor, chamber musician and choral master for both the Duke of Saxe-Gotha-Altenburg as well as of the Duke of Saxe-Coburg and Gotha, in Gotha in the current German state of Thüringen. He was also the composer of many well-known marches.

Napoleon's war took on its final end, when the allies of Austria, Prussia and Russia marched into Paris on 31 March 1814 to the tune of the "Pariser Einzugsmarsch". This tune was also used as the climax of the 1940 Victory parade of the Germans through Paris. Although attributed initially to Beethoven, Walch is the composer.

Another march by Walch is the famous "Beethoven Funeral March Number 1" played at the funeral of King Edward VII and also at the National Service of Remembrance in London on Remembrance Sunday each year on the Sunday nearest to 11 November. It is played after the playing of the Last Post, and during the Wreath Laying Ceremony. It is also announced as "Beethoven's Funeral March" on the BBC Television commentary. For a long time, the march was wrongly attributed to Beethoven, and catalogued as WoO (work without opus number), Anh. 13. The march was played during the processions to the lying in state at Westminster of Queen Elizabeth II, her husband Prince Philip Duke of Edinburgh and Queen Elizabeth The Queen Mother, at the procession to St Paul's Cathedral at the funeral of former British Prime Minister Margaret Thatcher on 17 April 2013, and during the procession to St George's Chapel at the funeral of Prince Philip, Duke of Edinburgh on 17 April 2021. On 25 March 2015, this same march was also played by the Singapore Armed Forces Band during the foot procession from the Istana to the lying in state of Lee Kuan Yew, Singapore's first Prime Minister, at the Parliament House of Singapore.

The march was also played during the funeral procession from the Capitol to the White House at the state funeral of President Kennedy on November 25, 1963.

Many marches supposedly written for several cavalry regiments by Queen Victoria's consort Prince Albert, who was also the Prince of Saxe-Coburg-Gotha and the Duke of Saxony, are actually by Walch, including the British regiment march, the Regimental quick march of the Somerset Light Infantry.

Sources
 Werner Probst: Johann Heinrich Walch komponierte den bekannten Trauermarsch von Beethoven. in: Mitteilungsblatt des "Arbeitskreises Militärmusik" der Deutschen Gesellschaft für Heereskunde, 21. Jahrgang, Nr. 2, Juni 1998, p. 98–105.

External links
 
 
 
 
 

German composers
Military music composers
German conductors (music)
German male conductors (music)
1776 births
1855 deaths